Samanthamalai (Samantha= Kula and Malai=Peak) is a panchayat in Veppanapalli Taluk in Krishnagiri district of Tamil Nadu, India. The place were part of Adi Karnataka (Right Hand) or Samanta Kula have settled. Its Pincode is 635115.

Demographics 
According to the 2011 Census of India, Samanthamalai had a population of approximately 3,000 out of which male percentage was 49% and female percentage was 51% approximately.

Samanthamalai majority religion group is Hindus, and minority are of Christianity. Widely spoken languages in the village include Tamil, Kannada and Telugu.

Transport 
Samanthamalai village is well connected to National Highway 44 and KGF state Highway.
Also public transports (Bus no 55) are frequently available with in the village and share auto's are also available.

Places 
Samanthamalai Panchayat consists of the following villages: 
 Guddur
 Chinna Guddur
 Ondiyur
 Pachikanapalli 
 Pethampatti

Schools 
 Govt Primary School, Samanthamalai
 Govt High School, Kundarapalli Ramapuram
 Sri Sathya Sai Bala Gurukulam, Kundarapalli
 Sri Saraswathi Vidyalaya Matric Higher Secondary School, Kundarapalli X Road

References

Cities and towns in Krishnagiri district